The Kekerengu Fault is an active dextral (right lateral) strike-slip fault in the northeastern part of South Island, New Zealand. It is closely associated with the Hope Fault and Jordan Thrust at its south-easternmost edge and likely joins with the Clarence Fault to form the Wairarapa Fault offshore in Cook Strait.

During this earthquake the offshore continuation of the Kekerengu Fault to the north east, known as the Needles Fault, ruptured as well.

References 

Seismic faults of New Zealand
Plate tectonics
Strike-slip faults